The Smith County Courthouse is a historic courthouse in Carthage, Tennessee, United States.

Location
The courthouse is located on the Court Square in Carthage, a small town in Smith County, Tennessee, United States. It overlooks the Cumberland River.

History
It was designed by architect Henry C. Jackson in the Second Empire architectural style. It has a mansard roof with a cupola.

Architectural significance
It has been listed on the National Register of Historic Places since April 17, 1979.

References

County courthouses in Tennessee
Second Empire architecture in Tennessee
Government buildings completed in 1877
1877 establishments in Tennessee